Popstars was a Brazilian reality television series based on the Popstars international series. In Brazil, Popstars was produced by RGB and broadcast on the Brazilian Sistema Brasileiro de Televisão (SBT) channel. Two series was broadcast for two seasons in 2002 and 2003, after which it was discontinued.

Popstars was a prime time program introduced on SBT to counter very successful reality television programs introduced by Rede Globo television chain via their series Casa dos Artistas and No Limite. The Brazilian Popstar series was broadcast for two seasons in 2002 and 2003.

Season 1 (2002)

The 2002 season was a competition of female bands to be chosen from prospective singers. It particularly saw the introduction  of the girl band Rouge, who finished second in the series, but proved to be a highly successful band with high sales of songs "Ragatanga" (Asereje), "Um Anjo Veio me Falar", "Não dá pra Resistir" and "Beijo Molhado", that were hits in 2002 and 2003. "Ragatanga" (Asereje) was a Portuñol version of The Ketchup Song" of Las Ketchup. The single sold more than 2 million copies in Brazil.

Marjorie Estiano, a contestant who had been eliminated in the earlier rounds, also became a famous actress with major roles in Rede Globo soap operas like Páginas da Vida (2006), Duas Caras (2007), Caminho das Índias (2009) and A Vida da Gente (2011).

Season 2 (2003)
With the success of the concept, SBT was encouraged to introduce a male version with boys competing for a place in a boy band. The winner was Br'oz that also found great success of releases.

Discontinuation
The program was discontinued after two seasons.

References

Sistema Brasileiro de Televisão original programming
Popstars
Brazilian reality television series
2002 Brazilian television series debuts
2003 Brazilian television series endings
Portuguese-language television shows
Brazilian music television series
Non-New Zealand television series based on New Zealand television series